Raj Musix Telugu is a Telugu language music channel, operated by the Raj Network in India. It was launched in March 2010. It is popular for Telugu movie songs and interactive shows. The channel is available on major cable and dish networks, and is also broadcast on the internet through TVU Networks.

See also
Vissa
List of Telugu-language television channels
Raj Network

References

Music television channels in India
Telugu-language television channels
Television channels and stations established in 2010
Television stations in Chennai